José Enrique Peña (born 7 May 1963) is a Uruguayan former footballer who played as a midfielder.

Personal life
Peña is the father of the Uruguayan footballer Agustín Peña.

Honours

International
Uruguay
 Copa América (1): 1987

References

External links
 
 

1963 births
Living people
Uruguayan footballers
Uruguayan expatriate footballers
Uruguay under-20 international footballers
Uruguay international footballers
Uruguayan Primera División players
Club Nacional de Football players
Montevideo Wanderers F.C. players
Huracán Buceo players
Deportes Temuco footballers
Chilean Primera División players
Expatriate footballers in Chile
Uruguayan expatriate sportspeople in Chile
1987 Copa América players
Copa América-winning players
Association football midfielders